Gorak-e Jamali (also Romanized as Gorak-e Jamali) is a village in Delvar Rural District, Delvar District, Tangestan County, Bushehr Province, Iran. At the 2006 census, its population was 148, in 36 families.

References 

Populated places in Tangestan County